Chorizanthe diffusa is a species of flowering plant in the buckwheat family known by the common name diffuse spineflower. It is endemic to California, where it grows on the coastline and mountains of the Central Coast, in sandy scrub, woodland, and forest habitat. It is erect to prostrate in form, its stem generally no longer than 15 or 20 centimeters. The leaves are up to 2 centimeters long and mainly arranged about the base of the plant. The inflorescence is a cluster of flowers, each surrounded by six hook-tipped bracts. The margins of the bracts proximal to the long hooked tip may be very thin and nearly invisible to wide and obvious, and they may be green to white to purplish. The flower itself is about 3 millimeters wide and white with a yellow throat. The tips of its tepals may be smooth or jagged or toothed.

References

External links
 Calflora Database: Chorizanthe diffusa (Diffuse spineflower)
Jepson Manual eFlora (TJM2) treatment of Chorizanthe diffusa
UC Photos gallery: Chorizanthe diffusa

diffusa
Endemic flora of California
Natural history of the California chaparral and woodlands
Natural history of the California Coast Ranges
Natural history of Monterey County, California
Natural history of San Luis Obispo County, California
Natural history of Santa Barbara County, California
Natural history of Santa Cruz County, California
Taxa named by George Bentham